

Keeanga-Yamahtta Taylor is an American academic, writer, and activist. She is a professor of African American Studies at Northwestern University. She is the author of From #BlackLivesMatter to Black Liberation (2016). For this book, Taylor received the 2016 Cultural Freedom Award for an Especially Notable Book from the Lannan Foundation.

Education 
While working as a tenant advocate, Taylor enrolled in night classes at Northeastern Illinois University. She moved to New York City before returning to Chicago, Illinois to complete her Bachelor of Arts degree in 2007. Taylor earned a Master of Arts in African American Studies from Northwestern University in 2011. Taylor earned her PhD in 2013 in African-American Studies from Northwestern University. Her dissertation is titled Race for Profit: Black Housing and the Urban Crisis in the 1970s.

Career 
From 2013 to 2014, Taylor held the Chancellor's Postdoctoral Fellowship in the Department of African American Studies at the University of Illinois at Champaign-Urbana. Taylor was a professor at Princeton University in the African American Studies Department. Opinion pieces authored by Taylor have appeared in The Guardian, The New York Times, The New Yorker, and Jacobin. Taylor has also appeared as a guest on Democracy Now!, NPR's All Things Considered, The Intercept podcast, and NBC's Why Is This Happening? with Chris Hayes among many many other venues. 

Taylor's book Race for Profit: Black Housing and the Urban Crisis in the 1970s was published in 2019 by the University of North Carolina Press. It was a 2020 semi-finalist for the National Book Award for nonfiction and a 2020 finalist for the Pulitzer Prize for History. She is a 2021 Guggenheim fellow.

On September 28, 2021, Taylor was named a MacArthur Fellow.

As of 2022, she is professor of African-American studies at Northwestern University, her alma mater, in Evanston, IL.

Activism 
On January 20, 2017, Taylor participated in the Anti-Inauguration, organized by Jacobin, Haymarket Books, and Verso at the Lincoln Theatre on the same day as the Inauguration of Donald Trump. Other speakers included Naomi Klein, Anand Gopal, Jeremy Scahill, and Owen Jones.

In 2017, Taylor co-authored a call to mobilize a women's strike, which culminated in the Day Without a Woman on March 8, 2017. In articles for The Guardian and The Nation, Taylor defended the 2017 Women's March.

On May 20, 2017, Taylor gave a commencement speech at Hampshire College, in which she referred to President Donald Trump as a "racist, sexist, megalomaniac." After Fox News aired a clip from her speech, she received numerous intimidating and derogatory e-mails, including death threats resulting in Taylor canceling scheduled talks in Seattle and San Diego. In response, Jonathan Lash, the president of Hampshire College, released a statement on June 1, 2017, in support of Taylor and her speech saying that it aligned with the mission of Hampshire College.

On July 6, 2017, Taylor gave the speech at the Socialism 2017 conference in Chicago.

Taylor was also a long-time member of the International Socialist Organization, a revolutionary Trotskyist non-profit that primarily organized student activists on college campuses. She was selected to serve on the group's steering committee in 2013, but resigned in 2019 following internal revelations among the ISO membership that the 2013 steering committee had interfered with an internal investigation concluding a rape was committed by an ISO member, who was subsequently permitted to remain in the organization. Shortly after the revelations and Taylor's resignation, the organization voted to dissolve itself.

In March 2022, Taylor was amongst 151 international feminists signing Feminist Resistance Against War: A Manifesto, in solidarity with the Feminist Anti-War Resistance initiated by Russian feminists after the Russian invasion of Ukraine.

Selected publications

Books

Race for Profit: The Political Economy of Black Urban Housing in the 1970s, 2013 

This book is derived from Taylor's dissertation from 2013 when she was at Northwestern University. Taylor extensively discusses the actions after the 1960 urban rebellion by the government to provide affordable housing for African Americans. The goal of the dissertation was to see if the private housing industry could successfully find a solution to the 1960 urban rebellion. Additionally, Taylor questioned the partnership of public and private sectors and argued that these two sectors had different goals that work in opposition to one another.

The Anti-Inauguration: Building Resistance in the Trump Era, 2016 
Edited by Anand Gopal, Keeanga-Yamahtta Taylor, Naomi Klein, and Owen Jones, this book brought together a collection of speeches from the 2017 Anti-Inauguration Event in Washington DC. The speeches examine the Trump administration and policies. The anthology discusses a resistance to the Trump presidency through existing movements by having these movements work in cooperation with one another. The book was published on January 30, 2016, by Haymarket Books.

From #BlackLivesMatter to Black Liberation, 2016 

From #BlackLivesMatter to Black Liberation was published on February 23, 2016, by Haymarket Books. It won the 2016 Cultural Freedom Award for an Especially Notable Book. This book analyzed the political aspects of the BlackLivesMatter movement, including the history of the connection between race and policing and how the movement is separated from black politics. Taylor examined the history and motivation for the #BlackLivesMatter movement and considered whether the United States was in a post-racial period. The book examined whether the movement can be applied beyond police brutality to wider spectrum of activism.

How We Get Free: Black Feminism and the Combahee River Collective, 2017 
This book is composed of writings from the founders of the Combahee River Collective, a group from the 1960s and '70s of black feminists. The writings highlight the Combahee River Collective's impact on today's black feminism. Taylor edited the writings and the book was published on November 20, 2017, by Haymarket Books. The introduction is an essay by Taylor regarding the legacy of the Combahee River Collective, which begins by framing her discussion in the 2016 presidential elections. Following the introduction is a republishing of the Combahee River Collective Statement.

Fifty Years Since MLK, 2018 
The authors include Brandon Terry, Barbara Ransby, Keeanga-Yamahtta Taylor, and Bernard E. Harcourt. Published on February 2, 2018, by MIT Press, this book discusses Martin Luther King Jr's activism and his impact on today's activism. The authors discussed MLK's work before he was assassinated and consider how history influences current activism.

Race for Profit: How Banks and the Real Estate Industry Undermined Black Home Ownership, 2019 
This book examines the roots of the falling homeownership rate for African Americans. The book was longlisted for the 2019 National Book Award.

Professional affiliations 
 Urban History Association
 American Historical Association
 American Sociological Association

See also 
Naomi Murakawa
Barbara Smith
Demita Frazier
Tressie McMillan Cottom

References

External links 

 
 
 Behind the News interview with Doug Henwood

Living people
21st-century American non-fiction writers
21st-century American women writers
African-American academics
African-American educators
African-American non-fiction writers
African-American women academics
African-American women writers
American women academics
American women non-fiction writers
Black feminism
Lambda Literary Award winners
MacArthur Fellows
Members of the International Socialist Organization
The New Yorker people
Northwestern University alumni
Princeton University faculty
Year of birth missing (living people)